FTC Atlétika is an athletics club from Budapest, Hungary. It is part of the sports society Ferencvárosi TC.

Honours and achievements

Men
National Championships:
Winners (37): 

National Cups:
Winners (42):

Women
National Championships:
Winners (20): 

National Cups:
Winners (20): 

European Champion Clubs Cup:
Runners-up (1): 
Third place (1):

Notable athletes

  Fikre Wondafrash
  Slobodan Branković
  Branko Dangubić
  Borislav Dević

External links
 Official website
 Hungarian Athletics Association

athletics
Sport in Budapest